Statistics of Meistaradeildin in the 1959 season.

Overview
It was contested by 5 teams, and B36 Tórshavn won the championship.

League table

Results

References
RSSSF

Meistaradeildin seasons
Faroe
Faroe